Great Northern Foal Stakes is a horse race in New Zealand. It is a listed 2 year-old race over 1400m run at Ellerslie Racecourse.

The race is currently known as the Auckland Futurity Stakes.

Up to 1998 it was run in late January and was a group 3 race, then it become a listed race. From 1999 to 2002 it was raced in late March or April before moving to late May in 2003.

Past winners include:

 Desert Gold who won the race in 1914.
 McGinty the 1982 winner who also took out the 1983 Caulfield Stakes and 1984 Rawson Stakes.
 La Bella Dama the 2000 winner who went on to win the 2000 Eight Carat Classic and in 2001 the Royal Stakes and King's Plate at Ellerslie, the Tesio Stakes at Moonee Valley and the LKS Mackinnon Stakes.

Winners 

The following are some past results.

See also

Thoroughbred racing in New Zealand

References

Horse races in New Zealand